Pallapatti is a panchayat town in Virudhunagar district in the Indian state of Tamil Nadu.

Demographics

In the 2001 Indian census, Pallapatti had a population of 24,319; of this males and females were each 50%. Pallapatti has an average literacy rate of 68%, higher than the national average of 59.5%: male literacy is 76%, and female literacy is 61%. In Pallapatti, 13% of the population is under 6 years of age.

References

Cities and towns in Virudhunagar district